Thandi Ndlovu (1953/1954 - August 24, 2019) was a South African medical doctor and businesswoman who was best known as the founder of the Motheo Construction Group.

Early life and education 
Ndlovu was born in Soweto, South Africa where she attended Orlando High School.

In 1976, whilst a student at the University of Fort Hare, Ndlovu entered into exile in order to escape the attention of apartheid security services. Between 1977 and 1984, Ndlovu joined African National Congress as an Umkhonto we Sizwe member operating outside of South Africa, moving from Mozambique to Zambia, and then onto southern Angola, where she received training; afterward, she attended a school for the Young Communist League in Moscow, USSR.

In 1984 she enrolled at the University of Zambia to study medicine, after which she returned to South Africa and interned at Baragwanath Hospital in Soweto.

Business career 
Whilst practicing medicine in South Africa, Ndlovu noticed that many of the ailments among her patients from Orange Farm were related to poor living conditions due to a lack of access to adequate housing, which prompted her to found Motheo Construction in 1997. She was noted for her ability to break into the male-dominated South African construction industry, and for growing Motheo into a large-scale builder of government housing, constructing over 80,000 homes.

Death 
Ndlovu died in a road vehicle incident on 24 August 2019 whilst on her way to a funeral in Rustenburg, North West Province.

References 

1950s births
2019 deaths
South African women business executives
South African women physicians
South African physicians
Road incident deaths in South Africa
UMkhonto we Sizwe personnel
South African women company founders
21st-century South African businesspeople
South African company founders